The 13th Flying Training Wing is a wing of the Japan Air Self-Defense Force. It is also sometimes known as the 13th Flying Training Wing. It comes under the authority of Air Training Command. It is based at Ashiya Air Base in Fukuoka Prefecture.

It has two squadrons, both equipped with Kawasaki T-4 aircraft:
 1st Flight Training Squadron
 2nd Flight Training Squadron

References

Units of the Japan Air Self-Defense Force